Gary John Hart (born 21 September 1976) is a professional footballer who plays for Royston Town. Hart spent the majority of his career at Brighton & Hove Albion. He was signed from Stansted in 1998, for £1,000 and a set of tracksuits.

Career

During May 2007, Hart was awarded with a new one-year contract after playing in a certain amount of games for the 2006–07 season. Hart was granted a testimonial year with the "Seagulls" with this deal.

On 6 December 2007, Hart joined Conference South side Havant & Waterlooville on a one-month loan deal. Hart joined fellow ex-Albion player Charlie Oatway at the club who retired from the professional game in the summer of 2007 due to injury. With an injury crisis at Brighton, Hart was recalled from his loan spell on 7 January 2008.

Hart was released by Brighton & Hove Albion manager Dean Wilkins during June 2008, but after Wilkins' sacking he was bought back to the club under manager Micky Adams, with whom both had worked during his first spell as manager at the club.

In May 2011 the club announced that he would be released at the end of the season following the ending of his current contract, along with five other players. On 16 July 2011, Hart was called back to the Brighton Reserves squad for the final time by manager Gus Poyet to captain the side in their Sussex Senior Cup final against Eastbourne Borough. It was the first competitive match to be played at the club's new Falmer Stadium. The home side won the game 2–0 with Hart scoring the first goal at the new ground.

After his release, Hart stayed in Sussex as he signed for Eastbourne Borough on 23 July 2011. Hart was released by Borough on 3 March 2014 and signed for Royston Town of the Southern League Division One Central on 31 March 2014. For the 2014–15 season he was also a coach for youth team Bishop's Stortford Saints U-16s.

References

External links

1976 births
Living people
Sportspeople from Harlow
English footballers
English Football League players
Association football forwards
National League (English football) players
Brighton & Hove Albion F.C. players
Eastbourne Borough F.C. players
Royston Town F.C. players
Stansted F.C. players
Essex Senior Football League players
Association football coaches